The Republic of China Military Academy is the service academy for the army of the Republic of China, located in Fengshan District, Kaohsiung. Previously known as the  the military academy produced commanders who fought in many of China's conflicts in the 20th century, notably the Northern Expedition, the Second Sino-Japanese War and the Chinese Civil War.

The military academy was officially opened on May 1, 1924, under the Kuomintang (KMT), but the first lessons began on June 16, 1924. The inauguration was on Changzhou Island offshore from the Whampoa (Huangpu) dock in Guangzhou, thus earning its name. During the inaugural ceremonies, Sun Yat-sen delivered a speech that was later to become the lyrics of the national anthem of the Republic of China. It has been considered one of the most important institutions of the Republic of China together with the National Chengchi University, which is a prestigious incubator for senior civil service. After the Republic of China government retreated from mainland China to Taiwan in 1950, the academy was re-established as the Republic of China Military Academy in Fengshan District, Kaohsiung.

Establishment

After the death of Yuan Shikai, China fragmented into numerous fiefdoms ruled by regional warlords. Sun Yat-sen attempted in 1917 and 1920 to set up a base in his native Guangdong to launch a northern campaign to unite China under his Three Principles of the People. However, his government remained militarily weaker than the local warlords' armies. Calls by Sun for arms and money were ignored by the Western powers. Then, in 1921, the representative of Comintern, Henk Sneevliet (using the name Maring), met with Sun in Guangxi. He proposed setting up a military academy to train officers for the revolutionary army, which confirmed Sun's ideas. The Chinese Communist Party sent Li Dazhao and Lin Boqu to discuss with Sun and his party on how to set up the academy. In 1924, in the 1st National Congress of the Kuomintang, the policy of alliance with the Soviet Union and CCP was passed as guidance for KMT. As a result, the final decision of the establishment of a military academy was made, and a preparatory committee was set up accordingly. The money necessary for the construction and support of the Academy in 1924-1925 was provided by the Soviets.

Organization, training, and students

In the beginning, the Academy had only one department which provided soldiers with basic training. While the main Academy goal was preparation of infantry units, it also provided special classes for artillery, engineering, communication, logistical and machine gun units. A special department for preparation of political agitators was established later.

The academy concentrated the revolutionary military talents at the time. Sun took the job of Premier of this academy in person although it was just an honorary title. Sun's favorite and rising star Chiang Kai-shek was appointed the first commandant of the academy. Liao Zhongkai, the famous leftist in the Kuomintang and Sun's treasury secretary, was appointed as representative of KMT to the academy. Zhou Enlai, Hu Hanmin and Wang Jingwei were instructors in the political department. He Yingqin and Ye Jianying were once military instructors.

The serious lack of expert teachers was the biggest problem for the Academy. That is why lectures delivered by Soviet officers were extremely popular with students. A.S. Bubnov, G.I. Gilev, M.I. Dratvin, S.N. Naumov prepared lectures which explained the development of military thought throughout human history and the division between western and Soviet schools of military thought.

Soviet officers taught different military subjects in the Academy using their broad experience gained during the Russian Civil War. Among them were I. Vasilevich (Janovsky), N. Korneev, M. Nefedov, F. Kotov (Katyushin), P. Lunev, V. Akimov Galina Kolchugina (wife of Vasily Blyukher who was commander-in-chief of all Soviet volunteer forces sent to China) read a course of lectures on political agitation.

The first two groups of students prepared by the Academy became the core for the formation of the first two National Revolutionary Army regiments (V.A. Stepanov was an advisor provided by the Soviet Union to help in this matter). The first two prepared groups of students included 500 officers, the third one had 800 officers and the fourth group had 2000.

Legendary graduates include Nationalist commanders Chen Cheng, Du Yuming, Xue Yue, Hu Zongnan, Hu Lien and Guan Linzheng and Communist commanders Lin Biao, Xu Xiangqian, Zuo Quan, Liu Zhidan and Chen Geng. The young cadets first showed their training and courage in the war against local warlord and dissident of Sun, Chen Jiongming  and later the unification of Guangdong province. Then they made greater contributions in the Northern Expedition.

The Muslim Ma clique General Ma Zhongying, who commanded the 36th Division (National Revolutionary Army), attended the Whampoa military academy in Nanjing in 1929.

Influence

The Whampoa Military Academy plays an important role in Chinese history. It not only supplied many military commanders for both the KMT and CCP, but also its graduates have much more influence on both parties' policies and governance. Especially for Chiang and KMT, the Whampoa Clique was pivotal for his governance. It competed with other cliques of KMT such as the New Guangxi Clique led by Li Zongren and Bai Chongxi, CC Clique led by Chen Lifu and Chen Guofu, Politics Research Group led by Yang Yongtai (楊永泰) and Zhang Qun. At the same time, when the CCP built its first Red Army after the Nanchang Uprising in 1927 most of its commanders were from Whampoa, and in the following two decades, the CCP trained its army in the Whampoa way.

The motto of the academy "Camaraderie" was proclaimed by Sun Yat-sen at the opening ceremonies. The irony is that during the Chinese Civil War both the commanders from KMT and CCP were trained and educated in Whampoa. They fought for different beliefs and ideals although they used to live and study together like brothers in arms.

The academy also had significant influence over the 20th century history of other Asian countries The fourth term of the Academy saw students not only from all parts of China, but also from different parts of Asia enroll. For example, there were 30 Koreans among them. Some of them were brought up in China, others were active participants during the national liberation movement of Korea in 1917-1926 and emigrated to China later only to take up arms for struggle for freedom of their country after their education was over.

A large number of students were originally from Vietnam. This group was led by the exiled leader to-be of the Communist Party of Vietnam and future leader of the Vietnamese struggle for independence, Ho Chi Minh.

Relocations
The original Whampoa Military Academy existed from 1924 to 1926. Over 6 terms it enrolled more than 7000. However, after Chiang Kai-shek purged the Chinese Communist Party during the Northern Expedition, the academy was moved (and renamed as Central Military Academy - CMA 中央陸軍軍官學校 and later as Chinese Workers and Peasants Military Academy) to the newly established capital in Nanjing after the defeat of the warlords in 1928. The academy moved again to Chengdu during the Japanese invasion.

Relocation to Taiwan
In 1950, after the Communist victory on mainland China and the establishment of the People's Republic of China, the academy was re-established in Fengshan, Kaohsiung as the Republic of China Military Academy (陸軍官校). The original site of the academy in Guangzhou is now a museum.

List of Superintendents
Note: "Class year" refers to the alumnus's class year, which usually is the same year they graduated. However, in times of war, classes often graduate early.
A "—" in the Class year column indicates a Superintendent who is not an alumnus of the Academy.''

Faculties
 Center for General Education
 Department of Civil Engineering
 Department of Physics
 Department of Foreign Languages
 Department of Political Science
 Department of Management Science
 Department of Chemistry
 Department of Electrical Engineering
 Department of Mechanical Engineering
 Department of Information Management

Notable alumni 

 Lee Shying-jow, Minister of Veterans Affairs Council (2016-2018)
 Justin Yifu Lin, Chinese economist

Transportation
The academy is within walking distance south of Dadong Station of the Kaohsiung MRT.

See also 

 Republic of China Naval Academy
 Republic of China Air Force Academy
 National Revolutionary Army
 Yunnan Military Academy, founded in 1909 
 Baoding Military Academy, founded in 1902
 Warlord era
 Sino-German cooperation
 History of the Republic of China
 Military of the Republic of China
 List of universities in Taiwan
 Blue Shirts Society

References

Further reading

External links 
ROCMA (Chinese)  - Official Site of Republic of China Military Academy (Chinese)
ROCMA (English)  - Official Site of Republic of China Military Academy (English)

 Audio file: RTHK broadcast in Cantonese
 People's Daily article: "China to Turn Site of KMT Military Academy into Tourist Spot" 
  Whampoa Military Generals Full List, by classes, 1924-1927
China Whampoa Military Academy Network

 
1924 establishments in China
1950 establishments in Taiwan
Military academies of China
Military history of the Republic of China (1912–1949)
Education in Guangzhou
Huangpu District, Guangzhou
National Revolutionary Army
Educational institutions established in 1950
Military of the Republic of China
Military academies of Taiwan
Universities and colleges in Kaohsiung
Major National Historical and Cultural Sites in Guangdong